Prime Minister of Azad Kashmir is the chief executive of Azad Kashmir region of Pakistan. The title of Prime Minister symbolizes the nominal independence of Azad Kashmir. The prime minister heads the Council of Ministers, who are members of the Azad Kashmir Legislative Assembly, the PM too is elected by the AJK Legislative Assembly which is directly elected by the people.

List of prime ministers

Timeline

See also
 Government of Azad Kashmir
 President of Azad Kashmir

References

Provincial Governments of Pakistan
 
Government of Azad Kashmir
Azad Kashmir-related lists
Azad Kashmir